The 1940 United States Senate special election in Illinois took place on November 5, 1940. The election was triggered by the vacancy left by the death in office of Democrat J. Hamilton Lewis. After Lewis' death, James M. Slattery was appointed to fill the seat in the interim period until the individual elected in the special election would be sworn-in. Slattery was the Democratic Party's nominee in the special election. He was defeated by Republican nominee Charles W. Brooks.

Election information
The primaries and general election coincided with those for other federal elections (president and House) and those for state elections.

Primaries were held April 9, 1940.

Democratic primary

Candidates
Benjamin S. Adamowski, State Representative from Chicago
James M. Slattery, interim Senator and former chairman of the Illinois Commerce Commission

Results

Republican primary

Candidates
C. Wayland Brooks, nominee for Governor in 1936
Ralph E. Church, U.S. Representative from Evanston

Results

General election

See also
1940 United States Senate elections

References

1940
Illinois
United States Senate
Illinois 1940
Illinois 1940
United States Senate 1940